Luminar Technologies Inc. is an American technology company that develops vision-based lidar and machine perception technologies, primarily for self-driving cars. The company's headquarters and main research and development facilities are in Orlando, Florida; a second major office is located in Palo Alto, California.

History

2012–2017: Deep stealth
	
Austin Russell, a 2013 Thiel Fellow, founded Luminar in California in 2012, at the age of 17. Shortly afterwards, Jason Eichenholz joined the company in Orlando as chief technology officer and co-founder. The company spent its first five years in stealth mode. 

Russell's goal was to develop lidar technology with improved resolution and range by having Luminar fabricate many components in-house, rather than relying on off-the-shelf devices. To increase the time automotive lidar provides for a vehicle to react safely from one second to seven seconds at highway speeds, in 2013 Luminar decided to reevaluate the standard operating wavelength for lidar systems. Luminar's lidar operates in the infrared range at 1,550 nanometers (153 terahertz), rather than the usual 905 nanometers. This moved the lidar signal out of the range of visible light, making it safe for human eyes even at higher power levels. Luminar's infrared range can be used at power levels 40 times those permitted for the standard wavelength without endangering eyesight, increasing its resolution especially at distances over 200 meters.

2017–2019: Funding and initial partnerships
Luminar emerged from stealth mode in April 2017 and received $36 million in series A funding. The capital was earmarked to set up a factory in Orlando to manufacture 10,000 automotive lidar devices. In September 2017, Luminar announced a partnership with the Toyota Research Institute (TRI), the research and development arm of Toyota focused on autonomous vehicles, AI, and robotics. TRI used Luminar devices in its Platform 2.1 test vehicles, a fleet of self-driving Lexus sedans.

By 2018, Luminar was on its seventh-generation application-specific integrated circuit (ASIC) design, and it had a fully integrated technology stack. The company added a Colorado Springs location in April 2018 when it acquired Black Forest Engineering, a company that specializes in high-performance indium gallium arsenide (InGaAs) receivers. Former Uber executive Brent Schwarz joined Luminar as head of business development in September 2018.

In June 2018, Volvo and Luminar announced a partnership for Luminar to provide lidar technology for Volvo's self-driving cars planned for the 2022 model year. Luminar's lidar for Volvo is the approximate size of a VHS, optimized for highway driving, and integrated into a car's roof just above the windshield. It can receive wireless software upgrades and interface with Volvo's automatic safety features, like automatic emergency braking. Volvo also announced that Luminar was the recipient of Volvo's first investment of an undisclosed amount from its newly established venture capital program, the Volvo Cars Tech Fund.

Audi AID (Autonomous Intelligent Driving) announced a partnership with Luminar in December 2018, selecting Luminar's lidar due to its longer 250-meter range and high resolution. In July 2019, Luminar raised $100 million in additional funding, bringing total capital raised to more than $250 million. It also developed a new model of its lidar, approximately one-third the size of the previous model. By August 2019, Luminar had 250 employees at the Central Florida Research Park in Orlando and another 100 in California. The company's portfolio included almost 50 patents, with approximately 150 additional patent applications pending.

From 2017 to 2020, Luminar partnered with more than 50 companies total, including 12 of the 15 largest car companies in the world.

2020–present: Public offering and growth

In May 2020, Volvo announced a self-driving highway feature, "Highway Pilot", to be powered by Luminar's third-generation Iris lidar. Volvo said the technology would be available as an option to car buyers starting with the XC90. Also in May 2020, Tom Fennimore, previously an investment banker, joined Luminar as chief financial officer.

On August 24, 2020, Luminar announced it was going public through a special-purpose acquisition company deal, with shares to be listed on NASDAQ. The merger with Gores Metropoulos, part of The Gores Group, was projected to raise Luminar's market cap to an estimated $3.4 billion. In addition to the $400 million cash infusion from Gores Metropoulos, additional capital totaling $170 million came from Peter Thiel, the Volvo Cars Tech Fund and Alec Gores, among others. On December 3, 2020, Luminar went public, trading as LAZR. Russell retained 83% of the company's voting power and took on the role of chairman.

Daimler AG's truck unit took a minority stake in Luminar in October 2020, investing in the company as part of its efforts to develop self-driving trucks. The next month, Intel subsidiary Mobileye selected Luminar to supply lidar sensors for its autonomous vehicles. The company announced in March 2021 that it had partnered with Volvo's self-driving software subsidiary, Zenseact, to combine Luminar's hardware and Zenseact's OnePilot software into a self-driving system, called Sentinel, to be sold to automakers. Also in March 2021, SAIC Motor announced it would use Luminar sensors and Sentinel software to provide autonomous functions in its "R brand" line of vehicles. To support the work, Luminar announced it would open an office in Shanghai.

In 2020 and 2021, Luminar moved its Orlando operations from the Central Florida Research Park to its other Orlando facility to increase its manufacturing capabilities. In April 2021, Luminar expanded its business into aviation, partnering with Airbus subsidiary UpNext to test how lidar can be used to facilitate autonomous flight and improve safety conditions for helicopters and other fixed-wing aircraft. Also in April 2021, Alan Prescott, formerly acting general counsel of Tesla, became Luminar's chief legal officer. The next month, Pony.ai, a self-driving vehicle company, announced that Luminar's Iris lidar systems would be used in its next generation of robotaxis. Luminar acquired OptoGration, a chipmaker based in Wilmington, Massachusetts, in July 2021. In November 2021, Luminar announced their partnership with Nvidia to support commercial availability of autonomous vehicle capabilities by 2024. In January 2022, Mercedes-Benz announced  Luminar will supply the lidar systems for future models of their vehicles including auto assist and full self driving systems. In April 2022, Nissan announced they would use Luminar technology to integrate advanced autonomous functionality in all their cars by 2030.

In January 2023, Luminar announced the acquisition of Civil Maps, a 3D mapping data startup, which it intends to integrate into its Sentinel platform. The next month it acquired Seagate's lidar division to further its lidar production capabilities.

Products
, Luminar's lidar sensors ranged in price from $500 to $1,000. One sensor provides 120 degrees of vision.

Prototype 
Luminar revealed its prototype sensor in April 2017 when it emerged from stealth mode. Luminar's lidar sensors are unusual in that they operate in a wavelength of 1,550 nanometers, rather than the 905 nanometers customary for previous lidar sensors. The company also opted for a different architecture from traditional lidar systems. Rather than using multiple lasers, Luminar uses a single laser that raster-scans an image thousands of times per second, in a manner similar to the cathode-ray tube in an analog television. Luminar's lidar devices combine the vision system and interpretive processing into one unit; other companies' lidar devices require analog-to-digital converters to combine these systems. Luminar's devices use indium gallium arsenide for their chips, rather than the conventional silicon, so that the sensors can operate at 1,550 nanometers and capture light more efficiently and the lasers can be implemented on the same substrate as the computational element. To reduce the price of its sensors, Luminar engineered them to minimize the amount of expensive indium gallium arsenide required. The sensor can detect objects at a range of up to 200 meters. Every 100 meters of vision gives a vehicle traveling at 70 miles per hour an additional three seconds to react to objects it detects. The sensor is the approximate size of a shoebox.

Iris
Luminar announced a full stack platform named "Iris" in 2019 that combines Luminar's laser sensor technology and software. Iris is a plug and play installation in a vehicle. It has a range of 250 meters for small and less reflective (dark-colored) objects, or up to 500 meters for larger, brighter objects. It weighs less than two pounds and operates with a single lidar sensor integrated into the top of the windshield. The system creates a virtual, three-dimensional map of its surroundings without needing a network connection or GPS. As of January 2020, two versions of Iris are announced for release in 2022: a version that enables hands-free "freeway autonomy" and a cheaper advanced driver-assistance systems version that enables autonomous functions like emergency steering and braking. Luminar Iris has a 120° Field of View and a 26° Dynamic Vertical FoV. The resolution is 300pt/sqdeg while the data rate (points per second) is not published.

Hydra
At the Consumer Electronics Show in January 2020, Luminar showcased Hydra, a lidar sensor offered to automakers for a recurring fee. Hydra is designed for highway driving and can detect and classify objects out to 250 meters. Bundled with Hydra is a perception computer, powered by Nvidia's Xavier hardware. Hydra is marketed to companies creating Level 3 and 4 autonomous vehicles in which automation can take over all driving functions under most or all circumstances. Hydra is also capable of lidar super-resolution – advanced interlacing and adaptive scanning that increases effective resolution at higher frame rates.

Sentinel
Co-developed with Volvo's Zenseact division, Sentinel is a self-driving system combining Luminar's hardware and Zenseact's "OnePilot" software that offers "proactive safety" features such as emergency braking and can receive over-the-air (OTA) updates. In 2021, Volvo announced Sentinel was expected to be a standard feature included in new versions of the Volvo XC90.

Operations
Luminar has operations in Orlando, Palo Alto, Detroit, Israel, and Munich. There is another office planned for Shanghai as of March 2021.

Competitors
Luminar's competitors include autonomous vehicle companies like Waymo and lidar companies like Aeva Inc., AEye Inc., MicroVision Inc., Ouster, or Velodyne Lidar.

Industry recognition
Luminar's Model G 3D LiDAR received a 2018 Prism Award for Photonics Innovation presented by SPIE, the international society for optics and photonics, in the category Imaging and Cameras.
In 2018, CNBC included Luminar in its Disruptor 50 list of innovative companies.

References

External links
 
 
 
 

Lidar
Laser companies
Self-driving car companies
Companies based in Orlando, Florida
American companies established in 2012
Technology companies established in 2012
Special-purpose acquisition companies
Companies listed on the Nasdaq